Asplundia alleni is a species of terrestrial plant belonging to the family Cyclanthaceae. This is a very distinctive plant: The stem is very short or absent but the petioles are up to 1.5 m long and bear palmate leaves, split into as many as 30 divisions up to 75 cm long.

This is a rare plant with a very limited distribution in central and eastern Panama.

References
New Species of Cyclanthaceae from southern Central America and northern South America

allenii
Plants described in 2003